The Molise regional election of 2013 took place on 24–25 February 2013, after that the 2011–2016 legislature was prematurely dissolved due to irregularities in the 2011 regional election. Paolo di Laura Frattura of the Democratic Party was elected President and the center-left performed approximately 16 points better than the center-left list for the Chamber of Deputies in the general election held the same day.

Background
In May 2012 a tribunal declared the 2011 election invalid due to irregularities and fraud committed by Michele Iorio (People of Freedom, President of Molise since 2001) and his center-right coalition. After an appeal filed by the center-right failed, the Italian Council of State confirmed the 2011 election as invalid on 29 October 2012 and a new election was scheduled for February 2013.

Results
|- bgcolor="#E9E9E9"
!style="background-color:#E9E9E9" align=left rowspan=2 valign=bottom|Candidates
!colspan="3" align="center" valign=top|Regional lists
!colspan="4" align="center" valign=top|Provincial lists
!colspan="1" align="center" valign=top|Total
|-
|- bgcolor="#E9E9E9"
|align="center" valign=top|votes
|align="center" valign=top|%
|align="center" valign=top|seats
|align="center" valign=top|Parties
|align="center" valign=top|votes
|align="center" valign=top|%
|align="center" valign=top|seats
|align="center" valign=top|group
|-
!rowspan="9" align="left" valign="top"|Paolo di Laura Frattura
|rowspan="9" valign="top"|85,881
|rowspan="9" valign="top"|44.70
|rowspan="9" valign="top"|3

|align="left"| Democratic Party 
| align=right|24,892
| align=right|14.84
| align=right|3
| rowspan="9" align="right" valign="top"|12
|-
|align="left"| Rise Molise
| align=right|14,282
| align=right|8.51
| align=right|1
|-
|align="left"| Italy of Values
| align=right|12,156
| align=right|7.25
| align=right|1
|-
|align="left"| Union for Molise
| align=right|11,022
| align=right|6.57
| align=right|1
|-
|align="left"| Union of Democrats for Europe
| align=right|6,831
| align=right|4.07
| align=right|1
|-
|align="left"| Party of Italian Communists
| align=right|5,512
| align=right|3.29
| align=right|1
|-
|align="left"| Left Ecology Freedom
| align=right|5,015
| align=right|2.99
| align=right|1
|-
|align="left"| Italian Socialist Party
| align=right|3,149
| align=right|1.88
| align=right|0
|-
|align="left"| We for Molise
| align=right|1,282
| align=right|0.76
| align=right|-

|-
!rowspan="5" align="left" valign="top"|Michele Iorio
|rowspan="5" valign="top"|49,567
|rowspan="5" valign="top"|25.80
|rowspan="5" valign="top"|1

|align="left"| The People of Freedom
| align=right|17,310
| align=right|10.32
| align=right|2
| rowspan="5" align="right" valign="top"|5
|-
|align="left"| Union of the Centre 
| align=right|10,514
| align=right|6.27
| align=right|1
|-
|align="left"| Great South
| align=right|8,565
| align=right|5.10
| align=right|1
|-
|align="left"| Project Molise
| align=right|7,383
| align=right|4.40
| align=right|-
|-
|align="left"| The Right
| align=right|2,440
| align=right|1.45
| align=right|-

|-
!rowspan="1" align="left" valign="top"|Antonio Federico
|rowspan="1" valign="top"|32,200
|rowspan="1" valign="top"|16.76
|rowspan="1" valign="top"|-

|align="left"| Five Star Movement
| align=right|20,437
| align=right|12.18
| align=right|2
| rowspan="1" align="right" valign="top"|2

|-
!rowspan="3" align="left" valign="top"|Massimo Romano
|rowspan="3" valign="top"|21.160
|rowspan="3" valign="top"|11.0
|rowspan="3" valign="top"|-

|align="left"| Building Democracy
| align=right|8,503
| align=right|5.07
| align=right|1
| rowspan="3" align="right" valign="top"|1
|-
|align="left"| Act Molise
| align=right|4,941
| align=right|2.94
| align=right|0
|-
|align="left"| Democrats for Molise
| align=right|1,114
| align=right|0.66
| align=right|0

|-
!rowspan="1" align="left" valign="top"|Antonio De Lellis
|rowspan="1" valign="top"|2,158
|rowspan="1" valign="top"|1.12
|rowspan="1" valign="top"|-

|align="left"|Democratic Revolution
| align=right|1,562
| align=right|0.93
| align=right|0
| rowspan="1" align="right" valign="top"|–

|-
!rowspan="1" align="left" valign="top"|Camillo Colella
|rowspan="1" valign="top"|1,141
|rowspan="1" valign="top"|0.59
|rowspan="1" valign="top"|-

|align="left"|Work, Sport and Social
| align=right|873
| align=right|0.52
| align=right|0
| rowspan="1" align="right" valign="top"|–

|-
|- bgcolor="#E9E9E9"
!rowspan="1" align="left" valign="top"|Total candidates
!rowspan="1" align="right" valign="top"|192,107
!rowspan="1" align="right" valign="top"|100.00
!rowspan="1" align="right" valign="top"|5
!rowspan="1" align="left" valign="top"|Total parties
!rowspan="1" align="right" valign="top"|167,783
!rowspan="1" align="right" valign="top"|100.00
!rowspan="1" align="right" valign="top"|16
!rowspan="1" align="right" valign="top"|21
|}
Source: Ministry of the Interior

References

2013 elections in Italy
2013 regional election
2013
February 2013 events in Italy